Supreme Soviet elections were held in the Ukrainian SSR on 4 March 1990, with runoffs in some seats held between 10 and 18 March. The elections were held to elect deputies to the republic's parliament, the Verkhovna Rada. Simultaneously, elections of oblast councils also took place in their respective administrative divisions.

They were the first relatively free elections held in the SSR, and the closest thing to a free election Ukraine had seen since the unfinished 1918 Constituent Assembly elections. Although the campaign was far from being clear and transparent, representatives of the Democratic Bloc were the first to provide a legal challenge to the authority of the Communist Party of the Ukrainian SSR in parliament. A total of 442 National Deputies were elected – short of the 450 seat total, due to low voter turnout.

The parliamentary convocation that convened after the 1990 election declared the independence of Ukraine from the Soviet Union on August 24, 1991. Later on, an amendment to the official number of parliamentary convocations recognized this 12th Convocation of the Parliament of the Ukrainian SSR, as the first Parliament of Ukraine of the 1st Convocation.

Background
In the wake of Mikhail Gorbachev's perestroika, the Law on Elections – adopted on 27 October 1989 – included provisions for direct elections of individuals (as opposed to group representation of civic organizations), the need for alternative (non-Communist) candidates, the elimination of a requirement for nomination meetings, and other relatively democratic provisions. However, the elections were far from being free – as the Communist Party retained control on the media, exerted political influence, and had a large financial resource base.

Electoral system
The elections took place according to the majoritarian electoral system in 450 electoral regions. In electoral regions where no candidate obtained at least 50% of the vote, a second round of elections was held.

The number of seats in the Supreme Soviet was reduced from 650 to 450.

Campaign
A total of 2,999 candidates contested the 450 seats, with four constituencies having only one candidate.

During the election campaign, the self-titled "Democratic Bloc" was formed, which included the People's Movement of Ukraine (Rukh), the Helsinki Watch Committee of Ukraine, the Green Party of Ukraine, and many other organizations.

Results
In the first round 112 candidates were elected. A further 330 were elected in the second round, leaving eight seats vacant due to low voter turnout. Further rounds of voting in six constituencies were scheduled for 22 April.

The Communists obtained 331 seats in the Rada. The Democratic Bloc obtained 111 seats out of 442. In the parliament, the democratic deputies formed the "Narodna Rada" (People's Council) group, which consisted of 90 to 125 members. Narodna Rada became the opposition bloc to the parliamentary majority and Ihor Yukhnovskyi was elected as the opposition group's leader.

Factions
 For a Soviet Sovereign Ukraine / "Group of 239" (Communist Party of Ukraine) – 239
 People's Council (People's Movement of Ukraine) – 125
 CPU Democratic platform (Party of Democratic Revival of Ukraine) – 41
 Democratic Party of Ukraine (Democratic Party of Ukraine) – 19
 Ukrainian Republican Party (Ukrainian Republican Party) – 12
 Unaffiliated members of parliament

Aftermath

The first meeting of the Parliament took place on May 15, 1990. The Communist deputies elected Volodymyr Ivashko to serve as the Parliament Chairman, but on July 19, 1991 he chose to move to Moscow for the position of Deputy General Secretary of the Communist Party of the Soviet Union. The Ukrainian Communists were rapidly losing popularity; by July 1990 ninety-two of the deputies elected as Communists declared themselves as "Independents". The remaining 239 communist deputies formed a new majority group they called "For a Soviet Sovereign Ukraine", informally known as the "group of 239".

On July 16, 1990, this Parliament adopted the Declaration of State Sovereignty of Ukraine. The Declaration was supported by 355 deputies.

On July 18 the "For a Soviet Sovereign Ukraine" group led by Oleksander Moroz elected Leonid Kravchuk as the Chairman of Parliament.

On 24 October 1990, the Parliament amended the 1978 Constitution of the Ukrainian SSR, in particular to exclude Article 6. Prior to the amendments, the supreme governing body of the Ukrainian SSR was the Central Committee of the Communist Party of the Ukrainian SSR.

On 24 August 1991 the parliament declared Ukraine independent and called for a referendum on support for the Declaration of Independence. In the following days it also banned the Communist Party of Ukraine and nationalized its property (this ban was only theoretical since de facto the Communist elite continued to rule the country).

On December 5, 1991 Leonid Kravchuk surrendered his parliamentary duties to accept the presidency of an independent Ukraine. The post of Parliament Chairman was awarded to Ivan Plyushch.

After the banning of the Communist Party of Ukraine, remnants of its elected deputies (the "group of 239") joined other left-wing parties; most became independent politicians.

Statistics
The first convocation had eight sessions where 85 legal documents were submitted. Six of the legal projects were initiated by the President of Ukraine and 38 by the Cabinet of Ministers. The most productive sessions were the last two (the 7th and 8th) where 60 legal projects were submitted.

Government leaders
Below is a list of the Chairmen of the 1st Convocation of the Verkhovna Rada of Ukraine.

Prime Minister
Note: an appointment to this office had little influence from the Verkhovna Rada until the constitutional reforms of 2004.

See also
List of members of the parliament of Ukraine, 1990–1994
1990 Ukrainian local elections

References

Ukraine
Parliamentary election
Parliamentary elections in Ukraine
Ukraine
1st Ukrainian Verkhovna Rada